David Stuart Harrison (born 30 July 1981) is a Welsh cricketer who has played for the England A team. He is a right-handed batsman and a right-arm medium-fast bowler.

David Harrison's father, Stuart and brother Adam also play cricket. Harrison appeared in 1999/2000 for England in the World Youth Cup and played in Second XI cricket in 2001 and 2002, before being promoted to the county side's first XI in August 2002.

1981 births
Living people
Welsh cricketers
Glamorgan cricketers
Wales National County cricketers
Marylebone Cricket Club cricketers
Glamorgan cricket coaches